is a Japanese professional shogi player ranked 5-dan.

Early life
Itō was born in Setagaya, Tokyo on October 10, 2002. He learned how to play shogi from his father when he was about five years old.

Shogi

Amateur shogi
As a second grade elementary school student in 2010, Itō represented Tokyo in the 9th  in and finished in second place. At the World Open Shogi Championships held in Minsk, Belarus in July 2013, Itō finished 90 to win the tournament as a fifth grade elementary school student.

Apprentice professional
Itō entered the Japan Shogi Association's apprentice school in September 2013 at the rank of 6-kyū when he was a fifth grade elementary school student under the guidance of shogi professional . Itō was promoted to the rank of apprentice professional 3-dan in April 2018 and obtained full professional status and the rank of 4-dan after winning the 67th 3-dan League (April 2020September 2020) with a record of 15 wins and 3 losses.

Regular professional
In SeptemberOctober 2021, Itō defeated Yūsei Koga 2 games to none to win the 52nd  tournament.

Promotion history
The promotion history for Itō is as follows.
 6-kyū: September 1, 2013 
 3-dan: April 2018 
 4-dan: October 1, 2020 
 5-dan: March 10, 2022

Titles and other championships
Itō has yet to appear in a major title match, but he has won one non-major title tournament.

Awards and honors
Itō won the Japan Shogi Association's Annual Shogi Awards for "Best New Player" and "Best Winning Percentage" in 2022.

References

External links
 ShogiHub: Professional Player Info · Itō, Takumi

Living people
2002 births
Japanese shogi players
Professional shogi players
People from Setagaya
Professional shogi players from Tokyo Metropolis
Shinjin-Ō